David Kim (Korean: Kim Jeong-wook; Hangul: 김정욱), 
better known by his stage name Dabit (Hangul: 다빗), is a South Korean-American solo singer-songwriter under KoffeeDream Management (KDM). He debuted on his birthday, December 5, 2013. His fanclub name is called "Dalbit" (Hangul: 달빛) which means "moonlight".
He was born and raised in the state of Ohio.

Biography

Childhood 
Dabit was born and raised in the state of Ohio, USA, the youngest of three brothers. He has been passionate about music since childhood and performed song covers from a young age. He started Berklee College of Music when he received a renewable scholarship. After two years of attending Berklee he decided to go to Korea to pursue his dream of becoming a singer-songwriter.

Pre-Debut 
Dabit auditioned at different companies in Korea, where he was able to become a trainee at Choeun Entertainment. He trained at Choeun Entertainment for a year to debut with the boy group 24K. Not long after the debut of 24K, Dabit realized that idol music was not for him. He decided to leave the company and join KoffeeDream Management (KDM) to help him to start his journey as a solo singer-songwriter.

Career

Debut 
Dabit released his first digital single "Whoo Whoo Whoo" on his birthday (December 5, 2013), making it a special moment for both him and his fans. Both songs in his first digital album, "Whoo Whoo Whoo" and "When the Wind Blows", are written and composed by Dabit himself. The song introduced Dabit's style of music, which can be best described as k-pop with a light jazz/swing influence.

Radio career 
Starting 2014, every Thursday 1am KST Dabit appears on Arirang Radio's "Hot Beat" called "Question Mark" alongside BIGFLO's Lex, where they  answer listeners' guestions and help them solve all the question marks, that they have in their lives. 
The show has received a great response globally despite time differences.

Acting career 
Dabit is currently undertaking acting lessons to pursue a career in acting, in addition to his singing. He made his first cameo appearance on SBS's drama called "Endless Love" and hopes to work towards bigger roles in the future.

Music career 
As of 2015, Dabit has released two singles, including his debut. He became the first Korean artist to perform in Tunisia in 2014, and has plans for a solo tour over the end of 2015 to 2016.

Discography

Korean discography

Filmography

Television drama

Radio show

Musical Theater

OST

Concerts and Events

External links 
 Official Twitter
 Official Facebook
 Official KoffeeDream Ent. Youtube Channel
 Covers' Youtube Channel
 Management

References 

 http://www.soompi.com/2014/01/01/exclusive-interview-with-dabit-korean-american-singer-and-soompier/

1989 births
Living people
Musicians from Ohio
Place of birth missing (living people)
American people of Korean descent
Berklee College of Music alumni